"Can't Stop Myself from Loving You" is a song recorded by American country music artist Patty Loveless.  It was released in April 1992 as the third single from her 1991 album Up Against My Heart.  The song reached No. 30 on the Billboard Hot Country Singles & Tracks chart.  The song was written by Kostas and Dean Folkvord.

Chart performance

References

1992 singles
1991 songs
Patty Loveless songs
Songs written by Kostas (songwriter)
Song recordings produced by Tony Brown (record producer)
Song recordings produced by Emory Gordy Jr.
MCA Records singles